The Deutscher Bund Gälischer Sportarten (also German GAA) is a union of German clubs, who play Hurling, Camogie, Gaelic Football, Gaelic Handball and Rounders. Currently, this union consists of 11 German Gaelic Athletic Association clubs. The Bund was founded in 2015. It organizes the German Gaelic football, hurling and camogie cups and is also responsible for the German national team selection for international cups.

History 
The union was founded in 2015 in Berlin. Its goals are the coordination of combined project and funding proposals and the organisation of the German cups in hurling, camogie and Gaelic football. The DBGS also coordinates coaching and referee courses for Gaelic games. The DBGS is currently not a federation of the GAA, but mostly a union of the German clubs which are part of the Gaelic Athletic Association, and the Gaelic Games Europe.

The long-term goal of the DBGS is the establishment of the Gaelic games as an official sport in Germany.

Clubs 
Currently there are eleven clubs in Germany.:

References 

Gaelic games governing bodies
2015 establishments in Germany
Gaelic games